Viktar Antonavich Shalkevich (born February 9, 1959 in Porazava; , Viktar Antonavič Šalkievič) is a Belarusian actor, poet and singer-songwriter.

Biography 
Shalkevich was born in 1959 in Porazava near Grodno in the Socialist Byelorussian Soviet Republic, he grew up surrounded by three cultures: the Belarusian, Polish and Yiddish. He graduated from the State Theatre Institute in 1980, until 1991 he was an actor at the Grodno City Theatre, since 1991 he has worked at Grodno Puppet Theater.

Shalkevich is an actor, poet and bard. Since his school days, he writes songs and performs them. He has performed in Belarus, Czech Republic, France, Lithuania, Germany (at Waldeck Castle), Poland and Russia. His texts have been translated into English, German, Polish, Ukrainian and Czech. His songs are very personal, full of sarcasm, irony and sadness over unfulfilled hopes and despite lofty themes he comes without pathos. During his performances he responds spontaneously and unpredictably.

Awards 
 Order of the Smile
 Winner of the Grand Prix festival Basovišča 1992
 Grand Prix of the festival "Jesień Bardow / Autumn of Bard in 1992"
 Winner of the festival "Pieśni Autorskiej ORRA"
 Nomination for the "Wydarzenie festiwalu"
 Winner was the Grand Prix National Competition "the arrival of the bard 2005"
 Winner of the Grand Prix National Polish Competition "Przybycie Bardow"

Discography 
 Niewidoczny mur/Unsichtbare Mauer 1999, Concert in Minsk, together with Ales Kamocki, Szymon Zychowicz and Dieter Kalka.
 Prawincyja 1992.
 Smutny biełaruski bluz/Sad Belarusian Blues/Смутны беларускі блюз 1996.
 Bałady i ramansy/Балады і рамансы, „Charter 97", 1998.
 Dobraj ranicy/Добрай раніцы, 2002.
 За сто крокаў ад Вострае Брамы, 2003.
 Haradzieniec pryziamliusia u Minsku/Live in Minsk/Гарадзенец прызямліўся ў Менску 2006.
 Światy Mikałaj (at the album Światy wieczar 2000).
 Jołaczka (at Dni latuć. Pieśni z-za kratau), „BMAGroup", 2005.
 New songs and anecdotes, „BMAGroup", 2009.
 Viktar Šalkievič, “uCentry”, 2019.

Theatrical performances 
 Плач перапёлкі
 Атрад
 Łzy syna marnotrawnego /Сьлёзы блуднага сына (main role)
 Słodka trucizna miłości /Салодкі яд каханьня (main role)
 Tutejsi/ Тутэйшыя

Literature

References 

Belarusian musicians
Belarusian singer-songwriters
Belarusian male actors
Belarusian male film actors
People from Svislach District
People from Grodno
Living people
1959 births
Articles containing video clips